Kastria is a small village in the Peloponnese peninsula, Greece. It is part of the municipality Kalavryta.

It is near the Cave of the Lakes.

It is just down the road from Glastra.

References

Populated places in Achaea